Kennedy Ongele Lorya professional Know with his Stage Name as Dynamq is a South Sudanese Reggae-dancehall artist, Professional DJ, Producer, the founder of Dynamq Sounds International and the Non-governmental organization Dynamq Foundation in Juba south Sudan.

Early life
Dynamq was born in a family of seven children. He grew up in a refugee camp in Kenya known as Kakuma, having had to flee the civil war in his native Sudan. His love for music came from attending Sunday school. He got himself involved with Jamaican music while at the camp. His affiliation with sound systems began with the Shashamane set. After relocating to Kansas City, Missouri he formed Dynamq 10 years ago and has competed in several sound clashes.

Career

Sound System | Sound Clashes 
His first big stage show was at the 1996 King Lions Sounds 'Rasta Festival' held at the City Hall in Nairobi. He is the reigning Rumble champion and holds the Bermuda Triangle champion title, he has also made it to the semi-finals in the popular Boom Clash in Jamaica and the River Nile Crocodile and Jamie Hype from Young Hawk sound formed Team USA to compete in, and win, the famous War Ina East championship.

He has shared the stage with various artists such as Damian Marley, Benjy Myaz, Lady G, Richie Spice, Luie Culture, George Nooks, Jesse Royal, Queen Ifrica, Mikey Spice, I Wayne, I-Octane and Beenie Man.

Awards and nominations

References

External links
Dynamq on Discogs

Living people
Dancehall musicians
Year of birth missing (living people)
South Sudanese singers
South Sudanese songwriters